The 1997–98 NBA season was the Spurs' 22nd season in the National Basketball Association, and 31st season as a franchise. This season is most memorable when the Spurs selected Tim Duncan out of Wake Forest University with the first overall pick in the 1997 NBA draft. After finishing with the third-worst record in 1996–97, the Spurs won the 1997 NBA Draft Lottery, dubbed as the "Tim Duncan Sweepstakes". During the off-season, the team signed free agents, three-point specialist Jaren Jackson, and second-year forward Malik Rose. 

The Spurs got off to a mediocre 10–10 start, but then won 17 of their next 19 games, and held a 34–14 record at the All-Star break. Despite losing Sean Elliott for the remainder of the season to a knee injury after 36 games, the Spurs finished second in the Midwest Division with a 56–26 record, and returned to the playoffs after a one-year absence. The Spurs had the second best team defensive rating in the NBA.

Duncan averaged 21.1 points, 11.9 rebounds and 2.7 blocks per game, and was named Rookie of the Year, and was also named to the All-NBA First Team and NBA All-Rookie First Team, while David Robinson averaged 21.6 points, 10.6 rebounds and 2.6 blocks per game, and was named to the All-NBA Second Team. In addition, Avery Johnson provided the team with 10.2 points and 7.9 assists per game, while Vinny Del Negro contributed 9.5 points per game, and Elliott provided with 9.3 points per game. Off the bench, Jackson contributed 8.8 points per game, while three-point specialist Chuck Person contributed 6.7 points per game, and Will Perdue averaged 5.0 points and 6.8 rebounds per game. Both Duncan and Robinson were named to the NBA All-Defensive Second Team, and selected for the 1998 NBA All-Star Game, which was Duncan's first ever All-Star appearance. Duncan finished in fifth place in Most Valuable Player voting, while Robinson finished in seventh place. Robinson also finished in third place in Defensive Player of the Year voting, while Duncan finished tied in fifth place.

In the playoffs, the Spurs defeated the 4th-seeded Phoenix Suns, 3–1 in the Western Conference First Round, but lost 4–1 to the Utah Jazz in the Western Conference Semi-finals. The Jazz would go on to lose in six games to the Chicago Bulls in the NBA Finals for the second consecutive year. Following the season, Del Negro signed as a free agent with the Milwaukee Bucks, while Person signed with the Charlotte Hornets, Monty Williams was released to free agency, and Carl Herrera was traded to the Vancouver Grizzlies.

NBA Draft

Roster

Regular season

Tim Duncan
The Spurs were coming off a poor 1996–97 NBA season; in which their best player, David Robinson—himself a number one draft pick in 1987—was sidelined for most of the year with an injury. The Spurs had finished with a 20–62 win–loss record. However, as the 1997–98 NBA season approached, the Spurs were considered a notable threat in the NBA. With both an experienced center in Robinson and the number one pick in Duncan, the Spurs featured one of the best frontcourts in the NBA. Duncan and Robinson became known as the "Twin Towers", having earned a reputation for their exceptional defense close to the basket, forcing opponents to take lower percentage shots from outside. From the beginning, Duncan established himself as a quality player: in his second-ever road game, he grabbed 22 rebounds against opposing Chicago Bulls power forward Dennis Rodman, a multiple rebounding champion and NBA Defensive Player of the Year.

Later, when Duncan played against opposing Houston Rockets Hall-of-Fame power forward Charles Barkley, Barkley was so impressed he said: "I have seen the future and he wears number 21 [Duncan's jersey number]." In his rookie season, Duncan lived up the expectations of being the number one draft pick, starting in all 82 regular-season games, and averaging 21.1 points, 11.9 rebounds, 2.7 assists and 2.5 blocks per game. His defensive contributions ensured that he was elected to the NBA All-Defensive Second Team and was also named NBA Rookie of the Year. Spurs coach Gregg Popovich lauded Duncan's mental toughness, stating his rookie's "demeanor was singularly remarkable", Duncan always "put things into perspective" and never got "too upbeat or too depressed." Center Robinson was equally impressed with Duncan: "He's the real thing. I'm proud of his attitude and effort. He gives all the extra effort and work and wants to become a better player."

Season standings

Record vs. opponents

Game log

Playoffs

|- align="center" bgcolor="#ccffcc"
| 1
| April 23
| @ Phoenix
| W 102–96
| Tim Duncan (32)
| David Robinson (15)
| Vinny Del Negro (6)
| America West Arena19,023
| 1–0
|- align="center" bgcolor="#ffcccc"
| 2
| April 25
| @ Phoenix
| L 101–108
| David Robinson (23)
| David Robinson (16)
| Avery Johnson (8)
| America West Arena19,023
| 1–1
|- align="center" bgcolor="#ccffcc"
| 3
| April 27
| Phoenix
| W 100–88
| Tim Duncan (22)
| Tim Duncan (14)
| Avery Johnson (5)
| Alamodome20,486
| 2–1
|- align="center" bgcolor="#ccffcc"
| 4
| April 29
| Phoenix
| W 99–80
| Avery Johnson (30)
| David Robinson (21)
| Avery Johnson (7)
| Alamodome27,528
| 3–1
|-

|- align="center" bgcolor="#ffcccc"
| 1
| May 5
| @ Utah
| L 82–83
| Tim Duncan (33)
| David Robinson (16)
| Avery Johnson (8)
| Delta Center19,911
| 0–1
|- align="center" bgcolor="#ffcccc"
| 2
| May 7
| @ Utah
| L 106–109
| Tim Duncan (26)
| David Robinson (14)
| Vinny Del Negro (5)
| Delta Center19,911
| 0–2
|- align="center" bgcolor="#ccffcc"
| 3
| May 9
| Utah
| W 86–64
| David Robinson (21)
| Will Perdue (11)
| Avery Johnson (5)
| Alamodome26,086
| 1–2
|- align="center" bgcolor="#ffcccc"
| 4
| May 10
| Utah
| L 73–82
| Tim Duncan (22)
| David Robinson (11)
| Avery Johnson (7)
| Alamodome28,587
| 1–3
|- align="center" bgcolor="#ffcccc"
| 5
| May 12
| @ Utah
| L 77–87
| David Robinson (21)
| David Robinson (13)
| Avery Johnson (8)
| Delta Center19,911
| 1–4
|-

Player statistics

Season

Playoffs

Award winners
Tim Duncan, Forward, NBA Rookie of the Year
Tim Duncan, Forward, All-NBA First Team
Tim Duncan, Forward, All-NBA Rookie First Team
Tim Duncan, Forward, All-NBA Second Defensive Team
David Robinson, Center, All-NBA Second Team
David Robinson, Center, All-NBA Second Defensive Team

Transactions

References

 San Antonio Spurs on Database Basketball
 San Antonio Spurs on Basketball Reference

San Antonio Spurs seasons
San
San Antonio
San Antonio